The EMD SD38 is a 6-axle diesel-electric locomotive built by General Motors Electro-Motive Division between May 1967 and October 1971. It had an EMD 645 16-cylinder engine generating , compared to the turbocharged EMD 645E3 V-16 engine that produced 3000 horsepower.  Aside from the 3-axle trucks and a longer frame to accommodate them, the SD38 was identical to the GP38; the SD38 had the same frame as the SD39, SD40 and SD45. 52 were built for American railroads, one was built for a Canadian railroad, four were exported to a mining firm in Jamaica and seven were exported to a mining firm in Venezuela. The SD38 was succeeded by a Dash 2 version called the EMD SD38-2.

Original Owners

An M version of SD38 was built for the Brazil Federal Railways (RFFSA - Rede Ferroviária Federal S. A.).

Forty of a passenger version, the SDP38, were built for the Korean National Railways in May-July 1967. The units were numbered 6351–6390.

None have been preserved as of January of 2021.

References
 
 Sarberenyi, Robert. EMD SD38, SD38AC, and SDP38 Original Owners. Retrieved on August 27, 2006

External links
 EMD#SD38, SD38AC, SDP38 Original Owners by Robert Sarberenyi

SD38
C-C locomotives
Diesel-electric locomotives of the United States
Railway locomotives introduced in 1967
Standard gauge locomotives of the United States
Freight locomotives